Ritchie Lawrence McKay (born April 22, 1965) is an American basketball coach who is in his second stint as the head coach of the Liberty Flames of Liberty University. McKay for the last 6 seasons had been the associate head coach to Tony Bennett for the Virginia Cavaliers at the University of Virginia. He had previously been the head coach of the University of New Mexico, Oregon State, Colorado State, Portland State, and Liberty.

On April 3, 2009, McKay was hand-selected by Bennett and lured from his head coaching position at Liberty to become Associate Head Coach at Virginia. On April 1, 2015, he returned as head coach of the Liberty Flames. McKay holds the Liberty school record for single-season wins, with his team attaining a record of 30–4 (as of March 9, 2020) in the 2019–20 season after winning the ASUN Conference regular season and tournament championships.

Life and sports

McKay got his first head coaching job with Portland State. After a poor first year, McKay led the team to a third-place conference finish in his second season.  He used that success as a springboard to his next coaching job, this time at Colorado State.  He stayed two seasons there before heading to Oregon State, and then another two at Oregon State before accepting the head coaching position at New Mexico.  While there, he experienced mixed success. In 2005, his team won the Mountain West tournament and an automatic bid to the NCAA tournament. That successful season helped launch forward Danny Granger to an NBA career.  Still, McKay couldn't turn New Mexico into a consistent program, and in February 2007, he was fired.

McKay then took a job at Liberty University, where he took the Flames to Big South Conference semifinals in back-to-back years.  His second-year, with the help of Seth Curry, McKay led the LU to a Division I school-record 23 wins and a bid to the inaugural CollegeInsider.com Postseason Tournament.  After the season ended, Curry transferred to Duke University, and McKay's longtime friend Tony Bennett was hired as head coach of the Virginia Cavaliers.  Bennett then asked McKay to join his staff as his associate head coach, and McKay accepted.  On April 1, 2015, McKay was selected to return to Liberty University as head coach.

En route to a school-record 28 wins, McKay's Flames defeated the storied UCLA Bruins on their home court in Los Angeles by 15 points, prompting the immediate firing of UCLA head coach Steve Alford in December 2018, before the Pac-12 Conference season even began. Ironically, it was Alford who replaced McKay at New Mexico after his firing there nearly 12 years earlier. The following year, he was the 2019 recipient of the Jim Phelan Award.

Personal life
McKay graduated from Westwood High School, and played college basketball at Seattle Pacific University, where he set the single-season and career record for steals, and he was third in career assists. McKay has a wife, Julie, daughter, Ellie, and sons Luke and Gabriel.

Head coaching record

References

1965 births
Living people
American men's basketball players
Basketball coaches from Indiana
Basketball players from Indianapolis
Bradley Braves men's basketball coaches
College men's basketball head coaches in the United States
Colorado State Rams men's basketball coaches
Liberty Flames basketball coaches
New Mexico Lobos men's basketball coaches
Oregon State Beavers men's basketball coaches
Portland State Vikings men's basketball coaches
Seattle Pacific Falcons men's basketball players
Virginia Cavaliers men's basketball coaches
Washington Huskies men's basketball coaches